Plappalli or Plappally is a Hindu Brahmin Caste in Kerala.  This caste is peculiar to Travancore and classified under Ampalavasis. The males are invested with Sacred Thread between the year 8 and 16.  Formerly the Ilayathus officiated as their priests, but now the service is performed by Nampoothiris or Pottis.

See also
 Ampalavasi
 Pushpaka Brahmin

References

Brahmin communities